Illinois Route 160 is a north–south highway in southwestern Illinois. Its southern terminus is at Illinois Route 15 south of Addieville, and its northern terminus is at Illinois Route 140 east of Alhambra.

Route description 
Illinois 160 runs northwest from Addieville to New Memphis via Okawville (near Interstate 64) before turning north. Between Okawville and New Memphis it overlaps Illinois Route 177. It then intersects with Illinois Route 161 at New Baden, U.S. Route 50 north of Trenton, and U.S. Route 40 north of Highland. Illinois 160 passes through the town of Grantfork just north of Interstate 70.

Illinois 160 is a rural state road. It has no direct connections to Interstates 64 or 70.

History 
SBI Route 160 originally ran from Alton to Greenville. In February 1935, this Illinois 160 was changed to Illinois Route 140. In 1959 it was used on the current Illinois 160 from New Baden to Highland; in 1960, it was extended south to New Memphis. In 1965, it was extended north to its current northern terminus. Finally, in 1967, Illinois 160 was extended one last time to its current southern terminus, to a new road for Illinois 15.

Major intersections

References 

160
Transportation in Washington County, Illinois
Transportation in Clinton County, Illinois
Transportation in Madison County, Illinois